Vladimir Petrovich Leonov (born 25 April 1937) is a retired cyclist from Russia. He competed in the 2000 m tandem sprint at the 1956 and 1960 Summer Olympics and finished in ninth and third places, respectively. During his career he won three national titles: in the sprint (1958, 1959) and tandem sprint (1961).

References

1937 births
Living people
Soviet male cyclists
Olympic cyclists of the Soviet Union
Cyclists at the 1956 Summer Olympics
Cyclists at the 1960 Summer Olympics
Olympic bronze medalists for the Soviet Union
Olympic medalists in cycling
Russian male cyclists
Sportspeople from Tula, Russia
Medalists at the 1960 Summer Olympics